Rachel Prusak (born 1975) is an American Democratic politician and nurse practitioner who was elected to the Oregon House of Representatives in 2018. She represents the 37th district, which includes West Linn, Durham, Rivergrove, Tualatin, and Stafford.

Professional career
Prusak graduated from Northeastern University with a BA in nursing and then earned a master's degree in nursing from Frontier Nursing University. Before her tenure in office, she was a family nurse practitioner who served elderly homebound patients for over 20 years, specializing in palliative and hospice care.

Political career
Prusak defeated incumbent representative Julie Parrish in the 2018 Oregon legislative election.

External links
 Campaign website
 Legislative website

References

Date of birth missing (living people)
Living people
Democratic Party members of the Oregon House of Representatives
American nurses
American women nurses
Politicians from West Linn, Oregon
21st-century American politicians
Northeastern University alumni
1975 births
Women state legislators in Oregon
21st-century American women politicians